The Titus Trust, a registered charity in the UK, is the successor organisation to Iwerne Trust. It runs evangelical Christian holiday camps for children and young people at private schools. The camps provide adventure activities including kayaking, climbing, go-karting, sailing, laser clay-pigeon shooting and other activities, while also providing Bible studies and discussion groups on the Christian faith.

History
Titus Trust grew out of the Iwerne Trust which was created in 1932 by E. J. H. Nash, popularly known as "Bash", in the village of Iwerne Minster in  Dorset, to promote evangelicalism in the Church of England and in senior leadership positions in the British establishment.  Many men who became influential church leaders attended the Iwerne camps, including John Stott, David Sheppard, Michael Green, Dick Lucas and Justin Welby. Randle Manwaring wrote  

Manwaring's book was criticised as offering "more partisan pieties than it does historical analysis".

The Titus Trust was set up in 1997 and took over fundraising from the Iwerne Trust. In 2000 it took control of the running of the holidays from Scripture Union.

John Smyth abuse scandal

John Smyth QC, a former Chairman of Iwerne Trust, had been wanted for questioning by the police at the time of his death in August 2018. There were multiple claims from former boys at Winchester College during the 1970s and 1980s of savage psycho-sexual beatings. Smyth had previously worked as a barrister representing Mary Whitehouse, who campaigned against cultural liberalism. Reports of his alleged physical abuse of at least 22 boys were revealed in an investigation by Channel 4 News in February 2017.

Iwerne Trust had carried out its own internal report in 1982, compiled by Mark Ruston of the Round Church Cambridge and David Fletcher of the Scripture Union, but it was not made public until 2016. It found Smyth targeted pupils from leading public schools and took them to his home near Winchester in Hampshire, where he carried out lashings with a garden cane in his shed. It said eight of the boys received a total of 14,000 lashes, while two more received 8,000 strokes between them over three years. Iwerne Trust called the practice "horrific" but did not report the claims to police for over 30 years, until 2013.

Smyth fled the United Kingdom in 1984 and moved to Zimbabwe where, in 1986, he set up summer camps for boys from the country's leading schools. He was arrested in 1997 during an investigation into the drowning of Guide Nyachuru, a 16-year-old adolescent, at the Marondera camp. He then moved to Cape Town, South Africa, where he ran the Justice Alliance of South Africa for some years. The Alliance describes itself as "a coalition of corporations‚ individuals and churches committed to upholding and fighting for justice and the highest moral standards in South African society." It transpired that he had practised the same vicious beatings on many more young boys in these countries.

Following his death, the Titus Trust released a statement which said: 

A group of survivors describing themselves as 'amongst the scores of victims' beaten by Smyth released their own  statement which outlined that they were 'appalled' by the response of Titus Trust. They denied the Trust had done all it could to ensure Smyth was properly investigated, and also its claim that the Trust was only notified of the allegations against him in 2014. They stated that one of its trustees, David Fletcher, had commissioned a report into Smyth in 1982 but not passed any information to the police. Fletcher also had a further report of Smyth's abuse in Zimbabwe in 1993. They also said that reports were stored in the loft of the chair of the Trust, Giles Rawlinson, and were not made available to any secular authorities until 2017, when they were requisitioned by Hampshire police under warrant. The survivors went on to say that the Trust had refused to engage with victims, show any concern for their well-being, or offer support. Their statement said: 

In 2018 there were calls for an independent inquiry into both the abuse, and the culture of the Trust that enabled John Smyth to evade justice despite awareness amongst so many trustees, associated clergy and senior figures within the Church of England. In August 2018, it was reported that a group of survivors had launched a legal claim against the Titus Trust, who were running the Iwerne Trust camps. The group of men who launched this action said that the Trust had remained silent since the allegations about Smyth emerged.  They engaged Richard Scorer to act for them. Andrew Graystone, acting as their advocate, said 

In March 2020 the Titus Trust reached a settlement with three men "who have suffered for many years because of the appalling abuse of John Smyth". The Trust expressed “profound regret” for the abuse, and apologised for “additional distress” caused by the way it responded to the allegations. A group of Smyth’s victims called in response for the trust to disband, as it had protected its own interests rather than offering care and support to victims.

See also
 John Smyth

References

Further reading

External links
 Official website

1997 establishments in the United Kingdom
Organizations established in 1997
Church of England societies and organisations
Christian charities based in the United Kingdom
Charities based in Oxfordshire
Organisations based in Oxford
Child abuse in England
Violence against men in the United Kingdom